Ligota Dolna may refer to the following villages in Poland:

 Ligota Dolna, Kluczbork County
 Ligota Dolna, Strzelce County